Chunta may refer to:

 Chunta Aragonesista, a political party in Spain
 Chunta (Arequipa), a mountain in the Arequipa Region, Peru
 Chunta (Ayacucho), a mountain in the Ayacucho Region, Peru
 Chunta (Junín-Lima), a mountain on the border of the Junín Region and the Lima Region, Peru
 Chunta (dancers), a traditional character in the Fiesta Grande of Chiapa de Corzo, Chiapas, Mexico
 Chunta (film), a documentary film about the Chunta dancers of Mexico, directed by Genevieve Roudané